Napoli is the Italian language name for the city, gulf, and province of Naples.

Napoli may also refer to:

Places 
 Gulf of Naples (Italian Golfo di Napoli), the gulf off the coast of Naples
 Metropolitan City of Naples (Italian Città metropolitana di Napoli), Campania, Italy
 Napoli, New York, a town in the United States of America
 Napoli di Malvasia, ancient name of Monemvasia, a city in Greece
 Napoli di Romania, ancient name of Nafplio, a seaport in Greece
Nāpili, in Hawaii

Media and entertainment 
 il Napoli, a local Italian newspaper
 Napoli, a 1996 album by Italian singer Mina
 Napoli, an 1842 ballet by August Bournonville
 Napoli, Napoli, Napoli, a 2009 documentary film about Naples
 Napoli, a Belarusian music project

Ships 
 Napoli, an Italian battleship completed in 1908
 MSC Napoli, a container ship which ran aground and was salvaged in Devon in 2007

Other uses 
 Napoli (surname)
 Basket Napoli, an Italian professional basketball club based in Naples
 S.S.C. Napoli, a football team based in Naples
 54th Infantry Division Napoli, an Italian infantry division of World War II

See also 
 Naples (disambiguation)
 Neapoli (disambiguation)